The following is a list of animals that are or may have been raised in captivity for consumption by people.  For other animals commonly eaten by people, see Game (food).

See also

 Game (food)
 List of meat dishes
 Marine mammals as food

References

Meat
Meat
Meat animals